Radfall is a hamlet between Whitstable and Canterbury, in southeast England. It lies between the Thanet Way and Thornden Wood, in the Canterbury district of Kent.

References

External links

Villages in Kent
City of Canterbury